Onefour (stylised in all caps) are an Australian drill and rap group originating from the Western Sydney suburb of Mount Druitt. They are regarded by many as the pioneers of drill-rap in Australia. Paving the way for the Australian Drill scene, heavily influenced by the drill scenes of the UK and New York. The group consists of 5 core members, Spenny, YP, Celly,Jay Lekks, and J Emz. YP and J Emz are brothers, OG Skanxy, 09Scary and others joined but left for no reason.

Their 2019 singles "The Message" and "Spot the Difference" caught the attention of rap fans internationally, particularly in the UK. The group's debut album Against All Odds, released November 2020 peaked at #7 on the ARIA Charts (Australia) and #8 in New Zealand. Their collaborations with The Kid LAROI, A$AP Ferg, Stormzy, AJ Tracey and Headie One further increased their popularity overseas, gaining the attention of Skepta, Dave, Central Cee, Tyga, Lil Mosey, Sheff G, Murda Beatz and T-Pain.

Their fame is said to have heavily influenced youth and teen culture in Australia, becoming the focal point of the group's legal issues with state authorities. The group was prevented from performing live music in Australia. Celly, a core member of the group, is incarcerated until at least June 2023, whereas Lekks, another core member, has allegedly been deported to New Zealand.

Music
Onefour have been labelled Australia's first drill rappers, with a sound heavily derivative of UK drill music, with the group incorporating UK drill's production style. However, they have a unique sound, which represents a Western Sydney subculture where young men are "lads", "" or "". Onefour were the first Islanders in this subculture to rap in an Australian accent.

The video for their single "In the Beginning" achieved one million views on YouTube in 48 hours, and became the group's first single to chart, debuting at number 39 on the ARIA Singles Chart. Their song "Welcome to Prison" amassed 7.4 million views in a year.

Legal issues
Whilst the group has established themselves as one of the most prominent acts to have come out of Australia, the group has also been plagued by many run ins with the law, with core member Celly currently incarcerated.

In 2019, Onefour were forced to cancel their first national tour following police pressure on venues. In December 2019, three members of the rap group—YP (Pio Misa), Lekks (Salec Su'a), Celly (Dahcell Ramos)—were jailed over several charges including reckless grievous bodily harm after a violent interaction at the Carousel Inn in Rooty Hill in July 2018. Misa was sentenced to four years in prison with a two-year non-parole period; he was released in December 2021. Su'a was sentenced to four-and-a-half years' jail with a non-parole period of two years and three months, and was reportedly eligible for parole in December 2021, however, this was not granted, and he was allegedly deported to New Zealand, appearing at a show in Tauranga with Spenny on January 3, 2023. Ramos was sentenced to ten years' jail with a non-parole period of six; he was originally eligible for parole in December 2024, however, after appealing his charges, his sentence was shortened to eight years jail with a non-parole period of four years and nine months; thus now making him eligible for parole in June 2023.

According to NSW Police, the group members are actively involved in street-based gang warfare in Western Sydney; however, J Emz stated in September 2020 that Onefour members had left the disputes of their teenage years behind and OG Skanxy, 09Scary and others from other countries who joined late 2020 left the group with no reason in 2021 ,he added.

Name and history

Onefour's name derives from a local street gang called NF14, and the fact the music group was founded in 2014. All five core members grew up in Mount Druitt, one of the most disadvantaged suburbs in Sydney. The members all knew each other from young at their schools and from their local church (Church of Jesus Christ of Latter-day Saints). Onefour all still identify as Mormons, and are all of Samoan descent.

The group's rivalry with 21District (a group from Parramatta) plays a big role in the lyrics of the group's music. The rivalry between the two groups applies to a greater crime and gang war between the Greater West suburbs of Sydney and the Inner West suburbs of Sydney, a feud that stemmed back to the 1990s.

Band members
Current members
 YP (born Pio Misa) – vocals (2019–present)
 Spenny (born Spencer Magalogo) – vocals (2017–present)
 Celly (born Dahcell Ramos) – vocals (2017–present)
 Lekks (born Salec Su'a) – vocals (2017–present)
 J Emz (born Jerome Misa) – vocals (2017–present)
 OG Skanxy (born Japheth N. Bosso) - vocals (2020-2021)
 09Scary (born Romeo Odame) - vocals (2020-2021)

Discography

Extended plays

Singles

As lead artist

As featured artists

Notes

Awards and nominations

APRA Awards
The APRA Awards are several award ceremonies run in Australia by the Australasian Performing Right Association (APRA) to recognise composing and song-writing skills, sales and airplay performance by its members annually. 

! 
|-
! scope="row"| 2021
| "In the Beginning"
| Most Performed Hip Hop / Rap Work
| 
| 
|-
! scope="row"| 2022
| "My City" (with The Kid LAROI)
| Most Performed Hip Hop / Rap Work
| 
| 
|}

J Awards
The J Awards are an annual series of Australian music awards that were established by the Australian Broadcasting Corporation's youth-focused radio station Triple J. They commenced in 2005. Onefour have received one nomination.

! 
|-
! scope="row"| 2020
| "Welcome to Prison"
| Australian Video of the Year
| 
| 
|}

References

2014 establishments in Australia
Australian hip hop groups
Australian people of Samoan descent
Criminals from Sydney
Drill musicians
Mount Druitt
Musical groups established in 2014
Musical groups from Sydney
Samoan musicians